Willemite is a zinc silicate mineral and a minor ore of zinc. It is highly fluorescent (green) under shortwave ultraviolet light. It occurs in a variety of colors in daylight, in fibrous masses and apple-green gemmy masses. Troostite is a variant in which part of the zinc is partly replaced by manganese, it occurs in solid brown masses. 

It was discovered in 1829 in the Belgian Vieille-Montagne mine. Armand Lévy was shown samples by a student at the university where he was teaching. Lévy named it after William I of the Netherlands
(it is occasionally spelled villemite).
The troostite variety is named after Dutch-American mineralogist Gerard Troost.

Occurrence

Willemite is usually formed as an alteration of previously existing sphalerite ore bodies, and is usually associated with limestone. It is also found in marble and may be the result of a metamorphism of earlier hemimorphite or smithsonite. Crystals have the form of hexagonal prisms terminated by rhombohedral planes: there are distinct cleavages parallel to the prism-faces and to the base. Granular and cleavage masses are of more common occurrence. It occurs in many places, but is best known from Arizona and the zinc, iron, manganese deposits at Franklin and Sterling Hill Mines in New Jersey. It often occurs with red zincite (zinc oxide) and franklinite ( (an iron rich zinc mineral occurring in sharp black isometric octahedral crystals and masses). Franklinite and zincite are not fluorescent.

Uses

Artificial willemite was used as the basis of first-generation fluorescent tube phosphors. Doped with manganese-II, it fluoresces with a broad white emission band. Some versions had some of the zinc replaced with beryllium. In the 1940s it was largely replaced by the second-generation halophosphors based on the fluorapatite structure. These, in turn have been replaced by the third-generation TriPhosphors.

See also
List of minerals
List of minerals named after people

References

External links

Nesosilicates
Zinc minerals
Trigonal minerals
Minerals in space group 148
Luminescent minerals
Minerals described in 1829